Sennen Andriamirado (1945 – July 15, 1997) was a Malagasy journalist. He was associated with the magazine Jeune Afrique for eighteen years and served as one of its four editors-in-chief. He is best known for his biographies of Thomas Sankara, the revolutionary leader of Burkina Faso from 1983 to 1987.

Bibliography 
 Il s'appelait Sankara, Jeune Afrique Livres, 1987
 Sankara, le rebelle, 1987, Jeune Afrique Livres, 1989
 Le Mali aujourd'hui, Jaguar, 1998, 2003
 Madagascar, Jaguar, 2004

Notes and references 
This article was originally translated from the French Wikipedia article :fr:Sennen Andriamirado.

1945 births
1997 deaths
Malagasy journalists
20th-century biographers
20th-century journalists